Woods Charter School is a charter school in Chatham County, North Carolina.

Founded in 1998, Woods Charter School is a North Carolina public charter school, serving approximately 500 students from kindergarten through twelfth grade.

In 2007, private funding was secured to construct a new school building, and in August 2008, Woods Charter School moved to its current location. Concurrently with the building project, The Woods Charter School Foundation, Inc. was established to raise funds for outfitting the building and meeting the ongoing needs of the school. During the 2016–2017 school year, the school constructed a new third science lab to complement the two existing science labs in the high school wing.

The elementary school has approximately 32 students per grade level and average class sizes of 16. Special features of the elementary school include a focus on the Core Knowledge Curriculum, Singapore math, physical education, art, music and French with specialist teachers, regular field trips and outstanding high school students serving as teaching assistants.

The middle school has approximately 40 students per grade level and average class sizes of 20.

The high school has approximately 46 students per grade level, with average class sizes of 12–23. Special features of the high school include a single and highly rigorous college prep curriculum based on the UNC minimum requirement guidelines, a range of College Board Advanced Placement courses, elective courses, a Senior Project, a 50-hour community service graduation
requirement, and individualized college counseling through our teacher-student advisory model.

Woods Charter School Board
The Woods Charter School Company is governed by a board of directors. Each year the parents and teachers vote for Board members, who serve two or three year terms on staggered cycles (see bylaws for specific details). The seven elected, voting members of the Board are all parents. Other members of the Board are a teacher representative elected by the full-time staff, a student representative elected by the students, and the principal. A "community" board member may, from time to time, be appointed by the Board; the community board member may or may not be a parent. The Board sets policy and governs the school, while the principal manages the school on a day-to-day basis.

School Board meetings are regularly scheduled for the third Thursday in the month.

Officers for the upcoming year are elected and monthly meeting dates are established at the June board meeting each year.

Athletics
Woods belonged to the Central Carolina Athletic League, which consisted of private, charter and Christian schools in the triangle area. The league was founded in 2006–2007 with Woods playing an instrumental part in its formation.

Woods Charter was in the NCHSAA 1-A Independent league during the 2012–2013 school year. In 2013–2014 Woods Charter School became part of the NCHSAA 1-A North Central Athletic Conference (NCAC). The schools in the NCAC are East Wake Academy, Kestrel Heights, Franklin Academy, River Mill, Roxboro Community, Raleigh Charter, Research Triangle, and Voyager Academy.

Fall Sports: co-ed cross country, varsity girls volleyball, varsity boys soccer, middle school boys soccer

Winter Sports: varsity girls basketball, varsity boys basketball, cheerleading, middle school boys basketball, middle school girls basketball

Spring Sports: varsity girls soccer, middle school girls soccer, ultimate frisbee, tennis (club),

Notable alumni
 Porter Robinson, electronic music producer and DJ

References

1998 establishments in North Carolina
Charter schools in North Carolina
Educational institutions established in 1998
Public elementary schools in North Carolina
Public high schools in North Carolina
Public middle schools in North Carolina
Schools in Chatham County, North Carolina